Cosimo Perrotta (born 1942) is an Italian professor of economic history at the University of Salento and author of the book Consumption as an Investment. Perrotta was born in Squinzano, Italy.

References

20th-century Italian historians
Italian economists
1942 births
Living people
People from the Province of Lecce
Date of birth missing (living people)
Academic staff of the University of Salento
21st-century Italian historians